The 2020 Bett1Hulks Indoors is a ATP tournament organised for male professional tennis players, held in Cologne, Germany, in mid-October 2020 on indoor hard courts. It was primarily organised due to the cancellation of many tournaments during the 2020 season, because of the ongoing COVID-19 pandemic. It is the first edition of the tournament and took place at the Lanxess Arena in Cologne, Germany, from October 12 through 18, 2020.

Singles main-draw entrants

Seeds

 Rankings are as of September 28, 2020.

Other entrants
The following players received wildcards into the singles main draw:
  Daniel Altmaier
  Andy Murray
  Mischa Zverev

The following players received entry from the qualifying draw:
  Lloyd Harris
  Henri Laaksonen
  Oscar Otte
  Emil Ruusuvuori

The following players received entry as a lucky loser:
  Marc Polmans
  Marcos Giron

Withdrawals
Before the tournament
  Aljaž Bedene → replaced by  Marc Polmans
  Ričardas Berankis → replaced by  Marcos Giron
  Gaël Monfils → replaced by  Dennis Novak
  Yoshihito Nishioka → replaced by  Alejandro Davidovich Fokina

Doubles main-draw entrants

Seeds

 Rankings are as of September 28, 2020

Other entrants
The following pairs received wildcards into the doubles main draw:
  Daniel Masur /  Rudolf Molleker 
  Alexander Zverev /  Mischa Zverev

Withdrawals
During the tournament
  Ričardas Berankis

Champions
All dates and times are CEST (UTC+2)

Singles

  Alexander Zverev def.  Félix Auger-Aliassime, 6–3, 6–3

Doubles

  Pierre-Hugues Herbert /  Nicolas Mahut def.  Łukasz Kubot /  Marcelo Melo, 6–4, 6–4

See also
 2020 Bett1Hulks Championship

References

External links
Official website

2020 in German tennis
2020 ATP Tour
October 2020 sports events in Germany